Lonnie R. Young (born July 18, 1963) is an American football executive and former cornerback and safety who is the current general manager of the Pittsburgh Maulers of the United States Football League (USFL). He played college football at Michigan State University, and was drafted by the St. Louis Cardinals in the twelfth round of the 1985 NFL Draft.

Early years
Young was born in Flint, Michigan. He attended Beecher High School where he played football, basketball and track and field.

College career
Young starred in football at Michigan State University. He played football under head coach Muddy Waters and played his junior and senior season under George Perles. In his senior season, Young recorded 3 interceptions. Michigan State went 6–6 that year, making it to their first bowl game since 1966, but they were defeated by the Army Cadets in the Cherry Bowl.

Executive career

Pittsburgh Maulers
On October 19, 2022, Young was named the general manager of the Pittsburgh Maulers.

References

Lonnie Young. Sports Reference. Retrieved 2021-02-07.

1963 births
Living people
American football safeties
Michigan State Spartans football players
New York Jets players
Phoenix Cardinals players
Players of American football from Flint, Michigan
San Diego Chargers players
St. Louis Cardinals (football) players
Ed Block Courage Award recipients
Baltimore Ravens scouts
New York Jets scouts
Arizona Cardinals scouts